Marawah is a low-lying island off the coast of the Western Region of the Emirate of Abu Dhabi, the United Arab Emirates.

Geology and geography 
Current research indicates that the island was formed from relict Pleistocene limestone platforms linked by Holocene sand and beach deposits and intervening patches of sabkha. There are three islands in proximity to Marawah: the small island of Al Fiyah to the west, the island of Junaina to the southeast, and the island of Abu al Abyad in the east.

Environment and Protection 
Marawah island is in the Marawah Biosphere Reserve, as recognised by the United Nations Educational, Scientific and Cultural Organisation, and is one of the six marine protected areas in the Zayed Network of Protected Areas, a network managed by the Environment Agency - Abu Dhabi.

History 
The west first became aware of the island around 1829 when the East India Company recorded its location in a nautical survey of the Persian Gulf.

Archaeology 
Although privately owned, the island is a key center of archaeology. Recent excavations yielded a small natural pearl that was carbon dated to 5800/5600 BCE. 

In 1992, the Abu Dhabi Islands Archaeological Survey (ADIAS) completed a preliminary survey of the island. Archeologists identified 13 sites dating from the Neolithic to the Islamic Period (12-13 AD).

In 2004, ADIAS discovered the oldest human skeleton ever found in the region amid the remains of Neolithic buildings and over 200 flint tools.  DNA was extracted from teeth that were recovered from the site, and it was determined that the remains were about 7,500 years old.

References

External links 
 UAE History, 20,000 - 2,000 years ago
 UAE Interact, Map Room

Islands of the Emirate of Abu Dhabi
Archaeological sites in the United Arab Emirates
Biosphere reserves of the United Arab Emirates
Former populated places in the United Arab Emirates
Western Region, Abu Dhabi
Private islands of Asia